The 2018 Davis Cup was the 107th edition of the Davis Cup, a tournament between national teams in men's tennis. It was sponsored by BNP Paribas. In 2018, new rules were introduced for the Group I and II zonal events, with ties now being played as best-of-three sets over the course of two days.

Croatia won their second Davis Cup on indoor clay in the final match held at 25 November with a 3–1 win over France.

World Group

Final

World Group play-offs

Date: 14–16 September 2018

The eight losing teams in the World Group first round ties and eight winners of the Zonal Group I final round ties will compete in the World Group play-offs for seeded spots in the 2019 Qualifying Round. Seedings are based on Davis Cup rankings as of 9 April 2018.

Seeded teams
 
 
 
 
 
 
 
 

Unseeded teams

Americas Zone

Group I

Group II

Group III

Date: 28 May–2 June

Location: Costa Rica Country Club, Escazú, Costa Rica (hard)

Format: Round-robin basis. The winner of Pool A will play-off against the runner-up of Pool B and the winner of Pool B will play-off against the runner-up of Pool A to determine which two nations will advance to Americas Zone Group II in 2019.

Participating teams

Pool A
 
 
 
 

Pool B

Play-offs 

  and  promoted to Group II in 2019.

Asia/Oceania Zone

Group I

Group II

Group III

Date: 2–7 April

Location: Mỹ Đình Sports Complex, Hanoi, Vietnam (indoor hard)

Format: Round-robin basis. One pool of 4 teams (Pool A) and one pool of 5 teams (Pool B). The winner of Pool A will play-off against the runner-up of Pool B and the winner of Pool B will play-off against the runner-up of Pool A to determine which two nations will be promoted to Asia/Oceania Zone Group II in 2019.

Participating teams

Pool A
 
 
 
 

Pool B

Play-offs 

  and  promoted to Group II in 2019.
  and  relegated to Group IV in 2019.

Group IV

Date: 29 January–3 February

Location: Sultan Qaboos Sports Complex, Muscat, Oman (hard)

Format: Round-robin basis. Two pools of six teams. The winner of Pool A will play-off against the runner-up in Pool B and the winner of Pool B will play-off against the runner-up in Pool A to determine which two nations will be promoted to Asia/Oceania Zone Group III in 2019.

Participating teams

Pool A
 
 
 
 
 
 

Pool B

Play-offs 

Europe/Africa Zone

Group I

Group II

Group III Europe

Date: 3–7 April

Location 1: Tennis Club Lokomotiv, Plovdiv, Bulgaria (clay)  Location 2: Ulcinj Bellevue, Ulcinj, Montenegro (clay)

Format: Round-robin basis. Two pools of four teams at each venue. The winners of each pool play-off against each other to determine which nation will be promoted to Europe/Africa Zone Group II in 2019. Two promoted - one from each venue.

Participating teams

Pool A (Plovdiv)
 
 
 
 

Pool B (Plovdiv)
 
 
 
 

Pool A (Ulcinj)
 
 
 
 

Pool B (Ulcinj)

Play-offs 

Group III Africa

Date: 18–23 June

Location: Nairobi Club Ground, Nairobi, Kenya (clay)

Format: Round-robin basis. One pool of four teams (Pool A) and one pool of five teams (Pool B). The winners of each pool play-off against each other to determine which two nations are promoted to Europe/Africa Zone Group II in 2019.

Participating teams

Pool A
 
 
 
 

Pool B

Play-offs 

References

External links

Official website

 
Davis Cup
Davis Cups by year